The Fiat 503 is a car produced by Fiat between 1926 and 1927. The 503 was based on the Fiat 501, with modified suspension and brakes. It used the 501's 1.5-liter engine, producing . The company produced 42,000 examples of the 503.

References
Fiat Personenwagen, Fred Steiningen, 1994. 

503

Cars introduced in 1926